Yang Yan (楊艷) (238 – August 25, 274), courtesy name Qiongzhi (瓊芝), formally Empress Wuyuan (武元皇后, "the martial and discerning empress") was an empress of the Western Jin dynasty. She was the first wife of Emperor Wu.

Early life and marriage to Sima Yan
Yang Yan was a daughter of Yang Wenzong (楊文宗), a marquess during the Cao Wei era, and his wife Lady Zhao. Her mother died early, probably when she was still in infancy, and she was initially raised by her maternal uncle and aunt (who breastfed her). After she grew older, she was raised by her stepmother Lady Duan. By this time, her father, who is said to have also died early, was probably dead. 

When she was young, she was described as intelligent, studious and beautiful. A fortune teller once foretold that she would have an extraordinary honour, and it was said that when the Cao Wei regent Sima Zhao heard this, he took her and married her to his eldest son Sima Yan. She had three sons and three daughters with her husband. After Sima Zhao's death in September 265, Sima Yan inherited his father's position and forced the Cao Wei emperor Cao Huan to abdicate in favour of him about five months later. This action ended the state of Cao Wei and Sima Yan established the Jin dynasty (as Emperor Wu). On 20 March 266, he created Yang Yan as empress.

As empress
Empress Yang's oldest son, Sima Gui (司馬軌), died whilst a child, making her second son, Sima Zhong the legitimate heir, by traditional succession laws. However, Emperor Wu hesitated about selecting him as crown prince because he was developmentally disabled. Empress Yang was instrumental in persuading him to have her son designated crown prince anyway, arguing that tradition should not be abandoned easily. She was also instrumental in her son's selection of a wife, as Emperor Wu initially favoured Wei Guan's daughter, but Empress Yang, friendly with Jia Chong's wife Lady Yang, praised Jia's daughter Jia Nanfeng greatly, leading to Jia Nanfeng's selection as crown princess.

In 273, when Emperor Wu was seeking beautiful women to serve as his concubines, he initially put Empress Yang in charge of the selection process. She preferred those women with slender bodies and fair skin, but did not favour those with beautiful faces. She also left off the list a beauty named Bian, whom Emperor Wu favoured, stating that since the Bians have served as empresses for three generations of Cao Wei rulers (Cao Cao's wife Princess Bian, Cao Mao's empress and Cao Huan's empress) that it would be too degrading for her to be a concubine. This decision displeased Emperor Wu, so he took over the selection process. Despite this and her husband's obsession with accumulating concubines, they appeared to have had a genuine and continuing affection for each other.

In 274, Empress Yang grew ill. She became concerned that whoever would be empress next (she was particularly concerned about Consort Hu Fen (胡芬), whom Emperor Wu greatly favoured) would not support her son. She therefore asked Emperor Wu to marry her cousin Yang Zhi. Emperor Wu, distressed over her illness, agreed. She died soon thereafter and was buried with honours due an empress in the tomb that her husband was eventually buried at when he died in 290. Concubine Zuo Fen wrote a long song of mourning in her honour.

In 276, based on his promise to her, the emperor married Yang Zhi and created her empress.

Notes

Sources
 

|-

238 births
274 deaths
Jin dynasty (266–420) empresses
3rd-century Chinese women
3rd-century Chinese people
People of Cao Wei